David Mills may refer to:
 David Mills (author) (born 1959), American atheist and author
 David Mills (bass) (1926–2020), Canadian bass singer, poet, composer and actor
 David Mills (Canadian politician) (1831–1903), Canadian politician, author, poet and jurist
 David Mills (comedian), British-based American comedy actor and cabaret artist
 David Mills (cricketer) (1937–2013), former English cricketer
 David Mills (editor) (born 1957), American editor and writer in Christian media
 David Mills (footballer) (born 1951), English footballer
 David Mills (solicitor) (born 1944), British lawyer
 David Mills (rugby league) (born 1981), English rugby league footballer
 David Mills (solar researcher) (born 1946), Australian scientist
 David Mills (TV writer) (1961–2010), American journalist, screenwriter and television producer
 David L. Mills (born 1938), American computer engineer
David P. Mills, British chemist
 Detective David Mills, a fictional character in the 1995 film Seven, played by Brad Pitt
 Dave Mills (singer), South African singer 
 Dave Mills (athlete) (born 1939), American sprinter 
 Gyp Mills (David John Mills, 1946–2019), sculptor and songwriter